Grupo Educaativo. is an organization that operates private schools in the Mexico City metropolitan area. The schools are:
Colegio Anglo Mexicano de Coyoacán in Colonia San Francisco Culhuacán, Coyoacán
Colegio Anglo Americano de Coyoacán in Fraccionamiento Paseos de Taxqueña, Coyoacán
Colegio Anglo Americano Lomas in Colonia Jesús del Monte, Huixquilucan, State of Mexico, near Lomas de Chapultepec

Colegio Anglo Mexicano serves pre-school through senior high school (preparatoria or bachillerato). The Colegio Anglo Americano Lomas campus serves preschool through high school while the Coyoacán campus serves preschool and primary school.

References

External links
 Colegio Nuevo México, S.C. 

Schools in Coyoacán
High schools in Mexico City
High schools in the State of Mexico